Pandharipande is a surname. Notable people with the surname include:

Rahul Pandharipande (born 1969), Indian mathematician
Vijay Raghunath Pandharipande (1940–2006), Indian physicist
 

Indian surnames